The Vatican Publishing House (LEV)  is a publisher established by the Holy See in 1926. It is responsible for publishing official documents of the Roman Catholic Church, including Papal bulls and encyclicals. On 27 June 2015, Pope Francis decreed that the Vatican Publishing House would eventually be incorporated into a newly established Secretariat for Communications in the Roman Curia.

History
In 1926, the library was separated from the printing and transformed into autonomous body that was entrusted with the sale of books that were being made to print by the Holy See.

The Apostolic constitution Pastor bonus of Pope John Paul II (28 June 1988) classified the LEV as an institution affiliated with the Holy See.

Description
It has its own constitution and its own rules.  The statutes of LEV, Article 2, states: "The Libreria Editrice Vaticana has the fundamental aim of publishing the documents of the Supreme Pontiff and the Holy See."

The company owns the copyright to all the writings of the Pope, but did not start enforcing the copyright until the accession of Pope Benedict XVI. The policy was announced on 31 May 2005. La Stampa was the first to pay royalties to the Vatican publisher, and the Union of Catholic Booksellers and Publishers protested the Vatican policy, which applied to texts no older than fifty years. The LEV's policy has been summarized as:

People, Peace and Society
In view of the long standing interest in promoting the Bible in many languages around the world, the Vatican Press has a long tradition in publishing and distributing peace literature in many languages around the world.

See also
 List of papal bulls
 List of Encyclicals of Pope Pius XI
 List of Encyclicals of Pope Pius XII
 List of Encyclicals of Pope John XXIII
 List of Encyclicals of Pope Paul VI
 List of Encyclicals of Pope John Paul II
 List of Encyclicals of Pope Benedict XVI

References

External links 
 Vatican Publishing House Website
 Information pages on the Vatican website

State publishers
Catholic Church organizations
Publishing companies established in 1926
Mass media in Vatican City
Italian companies established in 1926
Dicastery for Communication